Karl Neumann may refer to:

Karl Friedrich Neumann (1793–1870), German orientalist
Karl Eugen Neumann (1865–1915), translated Buddhist scriptures into German
Karl August Neumann (1771–1866), German-Austrian chemist
Karl Johannes Neumann (1857–1917), German classical historian
Carl Neumann (1832–1925), German mathematician
Carl Magnus Neumann (born 1944), saxophonist